Month's Mind is a piece for piano solo composed in 1935 by John Ireland.

A performance takes about 4½ minutes.

A Month's Mind is a requiem mass celebrated about one month after a person's death, in memory of the deceased.

References 

Solo piano pieces by John Ireland
1935 compositions